Uppsala (archaically spelled Upsala) is the county seat of Uppsala County and the fourth-largest city in Sweden, after Stockholm, Gothenburg, and Malmö. It had 177,074 inhabitants in 2019.

Since 1164, Uppsala has been the ecclesiastical centre of Sweden, being the seat of the Archbishop of the Church of Sweden. Uppsala is home to Scandinavia's largest cathedral – Uppsala Cathedral, which was the frequent site of the coronation of the Swedish monarch until the late 19th century.

Uppsala Castle, built by King Gustav Vasa, served as one of the royal residences of the Swedish monarchs, and was expanded several times over its history, making Uppsala the secondary capital of Sweden during its greatest extent. Today it serves as the residence of the Governor of Uppsala County.

Founded in 1477, Uppsala University is the oldest centre of higher education in Scandinavia. Among the many scholars associated with the city are Anders Celsius, inventor of the centigrade temperature scale that now bears his name, and Carl Linnaeus, the father of taxonomy.

Other Uppsala residents include filmmaker Ingmar Bergman, diplomat Dag Hammarskjöld, chemists Jöns Jacob Berzelius and Svante Arrhenius, actress Viveca Lindfors, and singer Malena Ernman.

History 

Uppsala was originally the name of a place a few kilometres north of the current city, now known as Gamla Uppsala (Old Uppsala). Today's Uppsala was then called Östra Aros (Eastern Aros, to differentiate it from Western Aros). (Old) Uppsala was, according to medieval writer Adam of Bremen, the main pagan centre of Sweden, and the Temple at Uppsala contained magnificent idols of the Norse gods. The Kungsängen plains along the river south of Uppsala have been identified as a possible match for Fyrisvellir, the site of the Battle of Fyrisvellir in the 980s.
The present-day Uppsala was at that time a port town of Gamla Uppsala. In 1160, King Eric Jedvardsson was attacked and killed outside the church of Östra Aros, and later became venerated as a saint in the Catholic Church. In 1274, Östra Aros overtook Gamla Uppsala as the main regional centre, and when the cathedral of Gamla Uppsala burnt down, the archbishopric and the relics of Saint Eric were moved to Östra Aros, where the present-day Uppsala Cathedral was erected; it was inaugurated in 1435. The cathedral is built in the Gothic style and is one of the largest in northern Europe, with towers reaching .

The city is the site of the oldest university in Scandinavia, founded in 1477, and is where Carl Linnaeus, one of the renowned scholars of Uppsala University, lived for many years; both his house and garden can still be visited. Uppsala is also the site of the 16th-century Uppsala Castle. The city was severely damaged by a fire in 1702.

Historical and cultural treasures were also lost, as in many Swedish cities, from demolitions during the 1960s and 1970s, but many historic buildings remain, especially in the western part of the city. The arms bearing the lion can be traced to 1737 and have been modernised several times, most recently in 1986. The meaning of the lion is uncertain, but is likely connected to the royal lion, also depicted on the Coat of Arms of Sweden.

In ecclesiastical terms, the place has always belonged to Uppsala parish, from 1961 called Uppsala cathedral parish. The incorporated parts of Uppsala belong to Gamla Uppsala parish, Helga Trefaldighets parish and Vaksala parish. After parish break-up in 1974, parts of the town are located in Gottsunda parish. After further building expansion, some are also in Denmark-Funbo parish, before 2010 in Denmark parish.

Until 1971, the town was part of the district court for Uppsala City Hall Court and has been part of the Uppsala Court since 1971.

Geography 

Situated on the fertile Uppsala flatlands of muddy soil, the city features the small Fyris River (Fyrisån) flowing through the landscape surrounded by lush vegetation. The central park Stadsskogen (literally "City Forest") stretches from the south far into town, with opportunities for recreation for many residential areas within walking distance.

The train to Stockholm-Arlanda Airport takes only 17 minutes, rendering the city easily accessible by air.

The commercial centre of Uppsala is quite compact. The city has a distinct town and gown divide with clergy, royalty, and academia historically residing in the Fjärdingen neighbourhood on the river's western shore, somewhat separated from the rest of the city, and the ensemble of cathedral, castle and university buildings has remained mostly undisturbed to this day. While some historic buildings remain on the periphery of the central core, retail commercial activity is geographically focused on a small number of blocks around the pedestrianized streets and main square on the eastern side of the river, an area that was subject to a large-scale metamorphosis during the economically booming years in the 1960s in particular. During recent decades, a significant part of retail commercial activity has shifted to shopping malls and stores situated in the outskirts of the city. Meanwhile, the built-up areas have expanded greatly, and some suburbanization has taken place.

Climate 
Uppsala lies immediately south of the 60th parallel north and has a humid continental climate (Dfb), with cold winters and warm summers. Due to its northerly location, Uppsala experiences over 18 hours of visible sunshine during the summer solstice, and under 6 hours of sunshine during the winter solstice. Despite Uppsala's northerly location, the winter is not as cold as other cities at similar latitudes, mainly due to the Gulf Stream.

With respect to record temperatures, the difference between the highest and lowest is relatively large. This is the highest temperature ever recorded in the Scandinavian Peninsula, although the same temperature was recorded in Målilla, Sweden, 14 years later.

The climate table below presents weather data from 1981 to 2010. According to ongoing measurements, the temperature has increased during 1981–2010 as compared with the 1951–1980 series. This increase is on an annual basis around 0.9 °C. Warming is most pronounced during the winter and spring. January, February, and March have had the most pronouncing increase in temperature, with each month increasing 1.5 °C or more. The only month that did not get warmer is June, which got 0.3 °C colder. During the 20th century, Uppsala has warmed drastically, especially the winter. If compared to the period 1861–1890, the annual increase in temperature is 1.8 °C. March is the month with the biggest increase, where the temperature has increased more than 3 °C since the latter parts of the 19th century.

Winter normally arrives in late November, and lasts until the middle of March when spring arrives. Summer usually arrives in the middle of May, and lasts until late September when autumn arrives. Precipitation is most common between June and November, in all these months it falls  or more on average. Rainfall can occur all year round, although it is less common in January and February. Snowfall mainly occurs between November and March. Snowfall in October and April can happen from time to time, but not every year. Uppsala has an annual average snow cover around 100 days.

Economy 

Uppsala has economic development in many sectors. Today Uppsala is well established in medical research and recognised for its leading position in biotechnology.
Abbott Medical Optics (AMO)
Cytiva
Pfizer (see Pharmacia)
Phadia, an offshoot of Pharmacia, now a part of Thermo Fisher Scientific
Fresenius
Q-Med (bioscience)
Biotage
Skandion Kliniken, proton therapy centre
Uppsala Monitoring Center, a collaboration between the WHO and the Swedish government known for their 'WHODD' medical coding dictionary.
[IAR Systems]

Higher education

Universities 
Uppsala University. Founded in 1477, under bishop Jakob Ulvsson. Originally a Catholic institution, after limited activity following the Reformation it was re-organised as a Lutheran institution in 1595, following the Uppsala Synod in 1593. The university has a famous anatomical theatre, constructed by the scientist and polymath Olof Rudbeck (1630–1702), in the old university building Gustavianum. The building is now a museum. The university has 13 student fraternities, known as "nations", each traditionally representing a geographical region of Sweden.
Swedish University of Agricultural Sciences (SLU, Sveriges Lantbruksuniversitet, main campus).

Other higher education 
 Johannelunds Teologiska Högskola. A Lutheran theological seminary established in 1862, located in Uppsala since 1970.
 The Newman Institute. A Catholic institution founded in 2001.
 Pingströrelsens teologiska seminarium. A Pentecostal theological seminary, which does not have accreditation from the Swedish National Agency for Higher Education and cannot confer Swedish academic degrees.

Museums and sights 

The Fyris river (Fyrisån) neatly divides the city into two different parts: the historic quarter to the west of the river and the modern administrative, residential and commercial city centre to the east. Most of the historical sights and university buildings are in the western part, with a medieval street layout, river views and parks and dominated by the cathedral.

The most outstanding building in Uppsala is the Domkyrka (Uppsala Cathedral), Scandinavia's largest church building ( high). Together with Uppsala Castle it has dominated Uppsala's skyline since its construction in the 13th century and can be seen from a long distance outside the city, other tall buildings being rare.

Facing the west end of the cathedral is the Gustavianum, built in 1625 to be the main building of the university, and served as such through most of the 19th century. It contains the Museum of Nordic Antiquities, the Victoria Museum (of Egyptian antiquities) and the university's cultural history collections. It also houses a perfectly preserved 17th-century anatomical theatre (used in its time for public dissections). Next to Gustavianum is the 18th century Archbishop's Palace, the official residence of the Lutheran Archbishop of Uppsala and the primate of the Church of Sweden.

Across the street from the Gustavianum in the University Park stands the University Hall, erected in 1879–86 in Italian renaissance style. The Uppsala University Coin Cabinet is located in the university main building.

Not far from the university stands the Uppsala University Library (Carolina Rediviva), the largest library in Sweden, with over 5 million volumes and some 60,000 manuscripts. The building was built in 1820–41.

On a circa 35-metre high hill to the southwest of the University Library stands Uppsala Castle. Its construction was initiated in 1549 by King Gustav Vasa, founder of the Vasa royal dynasty. Today the castle holds several museums, among them the regional art museum, and is the residence of the Uppsala County Governor (landshövding).

There are several botanical museums in Uppsala related to the world-famous 18th century botanist and zoologist Carl Linnaeus; the Botanic Garden next to the castle, the Linnaean Garden in the city centre, and Linnaeus Hammarby, Linnaeus' summer house in the countryside village of Danmarks Hammarby south of the city.

 north of Uppsala city lies Gamla Uppsala (Old Uppsala), the location of the pre-Christian settlement of Uppsala which later provided the new name for the medieval settlement further south. There are few remains, with the exception of several huge burial mounds of pre-Christian monarchs and the previous cathedral from 1164 A.D., traditionally said to be built over the old heathen temple (and recent archaeological investigations seems to support this notion). The site was a major religious centre in Scandinavia in pre-Christian times. After the old cathedral church burned down around 1240 it was only partially restored to a more modest size as it no longer was the seat of the Archbishop. The Gamla Uppsala Museum exhibits archeological finds made during excavations in Gamla Uppsala and related finds from other parts of Uppland, as well as exhibitions on the history of the site itself.

Transportation
Trains depart Uppsala Central Station in three directions. There are trains to the south, Arlanda, Stockholm and Linköping, to the northwest, Dalarna and Sala, and to the north Gävle, Sundsvall, Östersund and to the northern half of Sweden as well as sleeper trains to Narvik in Norway.

While Uppsala has no civilian airport of its own, Arlanda Airport is located about 30 km south of Uppsala. Ärna Airport north of Uppsala is a military airport.

Public transport buses and trains within Uppsala county are operated by UL.

Sports 

The largest arena in Uppsala is Fyrishov and is Sweden's fourth most visited, specialized in swimming, sports events, meetings and recreation. The facility includes areas for indoor sports, summer sport and a generous waterpark with waterslides, 50-meter pool, training pool, relaxation area and a large outdoor swimming pool. Accommodation is offered at the Fyrishov cabin area, and at the resort restaurants a good lunch or dinner can be enjoyed. Fyrishov AB's business also includes the operation of Gottsundabadet in which there is a 25-metre pool, a 10-metre children's pool and gym. The entire facility is open all year round and a large number of meetings and various events are held here annually.

In addition to activities within the arena Fyrishov AB runs Tävlingsstaden Uppsala in a collaboration between the sports organizers, Fyrishov AB, Uppsala, Uppsala Tourism and hotel business. Co-founded in 2006 by Fyrishov AB under the name SM-town Uppsala in 2007 but was expanded to include international events and competitions at high national level. The project aims to develop Uppsala, a leading sports town in Sweden. In 2009 there were 24 SM-competitions and major national and international competitions in Uppsala.

At Fyrishov the city's basketball team Uppsala Basket also plays, former KFUM Uppsala, their home games in the Swedish basketball league. There are also athletic club Uppsala, Uppsala, fencing club, Uppsala Judo Club, Sweden's oldest judo club, Uppsala volleyball companion, Upsala weightlifting club and Upsala Simsällskap, one of the world's oldest swimmingclubs. The sport that draws the most audience is floorball. Uppsala's two teams in the Swedish Super League, Storvreta IBK and IK Sirius IBK, have Fyrishov as their home.

One of the most classical sports events, the Swedish bandy final, took place at Studenternas IP 1991–2012. After being played indoors in Stockholm 2013–2017, from 2018 it is again played in Uppsala. It usually attracts a spectator crowd of more than 20,000.

Once every year, the Uppsala Union of Science and Engineering Students arrange a river rafting in the Fyris river with rafts built from styrofoam.

Other sports clubs located in Uppsala include:

 Dalkurd FF
 Almtuna IS
 Gamla Upsala SK
 IF Vindhemspojkarna
 IK Sirius
 IK Sirius Fotboll
 Unik FK
 Upsala IF
 Uppsala Judoklubb
 Uppsala 86ers, American football club
 Upsala Fäktning, fencing club
 Upsala allmänna schacksällskap (UASS), chess club

Notable people

Adiam* (1982–), musician
Amelia Andersdotter* (1987–), politician
Magdalena Andersson* (1967–), politician, Prime Minister of Sweden (2021–2022)
Anders Jonas Ångström (1814–1874), physicist
Svante Arrhenius* (1859–1927), scientist
Ingmar Bergman* (1918–2007), filmmaker
Jöns Jakob Berzelius (1779–1848), chemist
Hans Blix* (1928–), diplomat
Emilia Brodin* (1990–), football player
Arvid Carlsson* (1923–2018), neuropharmacologist
Anders Celsius* (1701–1744), astronomer
Hans Dahlgren* (1948–), politician
Lars Edlund (1922–2013), composer
Ulf Ekman (1950–), pastor
Stefan Eriksson* (1961–), criminal
Martin Eriksson* (1965–), musician
Marcus Eriksson* (1993-), basketball player
Malena Ernman* (1970–), opera singer
Johan Furåker* (1978–), Swedish/Danish artist
Robert Hägg (1995–), ice hockey player for the Detroit Red Wings
Torsten Hallman* (1939–), former motocross world champion
Lars Hollmer (1948–2008), composer
Dag Hammarskjöld (1905–1961), diplomat
Magnus Hellberg* (1991–), hockey player
In Solitude, heavy metal band
Imp Kerr* (1980–), artist
Mattias Klum* (1968–), photographer
Gösta Knutsson (1903–1973), author and radio producer
Anna Maria Lenngren* (1754–1817), poet.
Carl-Bertil Laurell* (1919–2001), medical doctor and researcher
Dave Lepard* (1980–2006), musician
Bruno Liljefors* (1860–1939), painter
Ruben Liljefors* (1871–1936), composer and conductor
Viveca Lindfors* (1920–1995), actress
Carolus Linnaeus (1707–1778), scientist
Andreas Lundstedt* (1972–), singer
Veronica Maggio* (1981–), singer
Jan Mårtenson* (1933–), diplomat and author
Håkan Nesser (1950–), author
Stefan Parkman* (1952–), conductor
Bo Johan Renck* (1966–), music artist and music video director
Emma Rendel* (1976–), author and illustrator
Hillevi Rombin* (1933–1996), Miss Sweden 1955, Miss Universe 1955
Hans Rosling* (1948–2017), physician and statistician
Olaus Rudbeckius (1630–1702), scientist
Rasmus Sandin* (2000–), professional ice hockey player
Dina Schneidermann, (1930/1931–2016), musician
Martin Söderström* (1990–), professional mountain biker
Roine Stolt* (1956–), musician
Anders Tegnell* (1956–), physician and civil servant
Owe Thörnqvist* (1929–), artist
Rebecka Törnqvist* (1964–), artist
Watain, black metal band
(* = born in Uppsala)

References in popular culture 
In the History Channel's Canadian-Irish TV series Vikings, Uppsala is visited by Ragnar Lothbrok and his entourage to worship the Aesir gods and offer a human sacrifice to appease them. In that visit Lothbrok meets Uppsala's King Horik. The episode was criticised for its poorly researched depiction of Uppsala, which was shown as being located in a mountainous region, as well as of its heathen temple, which in the series was built in the style of a medieval Christian stave church.

The literary series Pelle Svanslös (Pelle No Tail) which follows the adventures of a cat with no tail and his friends created by author Gösta Knutsson takes place in Uppsala.

See also 
 Allianshallen
 Area code 018
 Ärna – Uppsala airport
 Battle of Fýrisvellir
 Disting
 Easter Riots
 Fyrishov – Fyrishov Water Park
 Gamla Uppsala – Old Uppsala parish
 Graneberg
 History of Uppland
 Temple at Uppsala – Temple of Old Uppsala
 UppCon – one of Scandinavia's biggest youth events
 Upplands Lokaltrafik – operator of local public transport
 Uppsala Central Station
 Uppsala Konsert & Kongress
 Uppsala Municipality – Uppsala "kommun"
 Uppsalatidningen – free local newspaper
 Upsala College – former private college in East Orange, New Jersey, U.S., founded in 1893
 Upsala Nya Tidning – newspaper for Uppsala city and county
 Upsala-Lenna Jernväg

References

Further reading

External links 

 Uppsala – Official site
 Destination Uppsala – Official visitors' guide
 Uppsala cityguide – Cityguide
 Upsala Nya Tidning – Newspaper
 Lokala nyheter – Newspaper
 Ancient See of Upsala – Article from the Catholic Encyclopedia

 
County seats in Sweden
Municipal seats of Uppsala County
Swedish municipal seats
Populated places in Uppsala County
Populated places in Uppsala Municipality
18th-century fires
Cities in Uppsala County
18th-century disasters in Sweden